Prince Palatine may refer to:

 Prince Rupert of the Rhine
 No. 60052 Prince Palatine, steam engine
 Prince Palatine, race horse